Zeybeks, sometimes spelled as Zeibeks ( Zeibekoi), were irregular militia and guerrilla fighters living in West Anatolia from late 17th to early 20th centuries.

History
The origins of Zeybeks are debated with most Turkish sources supporting that they are Turkic. One Turkish source states the Zeybeks first appeared in the 13th century and were Turkmens who settled into the Aegean Region. Another Turkish source links them to the Turkmen-Celali rebels in the 16th century, while a different Turkish writer claims that Zeybeks were light infantry troops made of Turkmen tribes loyal to the Seljuks. According to Aşıkpaşazade, an Ottoman Turkish Historian from the 15th century, Zeybeks were Muslim Gazis protecting the borders in Anatolia. In the Turkish society the Zeybeks and Yörüks are seen as the same people. Many famous Zeybeks like Yörük Ali Efe and Demirci Mehmet Efe belonged to Yörük tribes. Ottoman Turkish author Osman Hamdi Bey supports that they were descendants of the Trallians and unrelated to the Turks.

However, according to other sources, mostly Greek, the Zeybeks were of Greek origin. According to Greek historian Kostas B. Spanos, the Zeybeks were Greeks who migrated from Thrace and settled in Bursa, Aydin and Sakarya. They were Islamized but not Turkified. According to another Greek historian, Georgios Skalieris, they were of Greek and Phrygo-Pelasgian descent. Greek historian Thomas Korovinis, in his detailed study of the Zeybeks, summarizes 7 of the main theories on their origins. These posit that the Zeybeks are the descendants of:

1) Turkomans and Yoruks
2) Levantines
3) Ancient Anatolians.
4) Ephesians, Ionians and Lydians.
5) Graeco-Phrygians (see Graeco-Phrygian languages).
6) Greeks and Thracians.
7) Trallians and neighboring nomads, such as the Yoruks.

Traditionally, the Zeybeks acted as protectors of village people against landlords, bandits, and tax collectors. A leader of a Zeybek gang was called Efe and his soldiers were known as either Zeybeks or Kızan. The term "Efe" was used for the leaders of Zeybek groups, while the "Kızan" were beneath the Zeybeks. According to the Armenian-Turkish linguist Sevan Nisanyan, the origin of the term "Efe" is either of Greek (efevos, 'young man with courage') or Turkic (eğe, ece, ebe, "big brother" in old Turkic) origin. The  origin of the term "Zeybek" is according to Nisanyan also not clear. According to Nisanyan, it is either of Turkic or Arabic origin Some sources claim that it evolved from sübek, sü meaning "army, soldiers" and bek meaning "lord (bey)" in old Turkic. According to Onur Akdogu, it evolved from saybek, meaning "strong guardian" in old Turkic. According to Paul Wittek it may evolve from the name "Salpakis Mantachias" used by the Byzantine historian Pachymeres for Mentesh Bey, who founded the Beylik of Menteşe in southwestern Anatolia. The term "Kızan" is of Turkic origin and means "boy". Kızan was generally used for newly recruited or inexperienced Zeybeks. There was generally a tribe democracy within a group. Decisions were made in a democratic way and after the decision was made, Efe had an uncontroversial authority. They followed definite rituals for all actions; for example, the promotion of a kızan to zeybek was very similar to Ahi rituals.

From the 17th to 19th century, the Zeybeks evolved to outlaws and bandits terrorizing the Aegean Region. Before the Treaty of Lausanne and the establishment of the Republic of Turkey, larger concentrations of Zeybeks could be found on the Aegean coast of western Anatolia, near the city of İzmir (Greek: Smyrna) and Magnesia. After the Greek landing at Smyrna they fought against the Greek occupation of western Turkey. Following the formation of a Turkish national army, during the Greco-Turkish War of 1919–1922, most of them joined the regular forces and continued their resistance. During and after the Turkish War of Independence they were no longer seen as bandits and outlaws, but as heroes, nationalist forces fighting against a foreign and non-muslim force. An English report about the Zeybeks and Yörüks states; "Those people hate the Greeks, and are known for their heroism."

Culture
Zeybeks have a dance called the Zeybek dance (or Zeibekiko in Greece). There are different Zeybek dances in Turkey. There is the "Avşar Zeybeği" (The Afshars were an Oghuz Turkic tribe.), Aydın Zeybeği, Muğla Zeybeği, Tavas Zeybeği, Kordon Zeybeği, Bergama Zeybeği, Soma Zeybeği, Ortaklar Zeybeği, Pamukçu Zeybeği, Harmandalı Zeybeği, Sakız Zeybeği, Tefenni Zeybeği, Kadıoğlu Zeybeği, Kocaarap Zeybeği (Koca = Big, Arap = Arab), Abdal Zeybeği (Turkmen Bektashi dervishes were often called "Abdal", there was also an "Abdal" tribe belonging to the White Huns) and Bengi (Bengü meant "eternity" in old Turkic) Zeybeği.The Greek version of the dance was brought by Greeks from Izmir to Greece, which used to be called "Türkikos", but this name is not used anymore. Romantic songs about their bravery are still popular in Turkish and Greek folk music. The yatagan sword was their primary weapon, but most of them carried firearms as well.

See also
Efe, the leaders of bands of Zeybeks and Kızan
Zeibekiko (Greek dance) and Zeybek (Turkish dance)
Bashi Bazouk
Atçalı Kel Mehmet
Yörük Ali Efe
Çakırcalı Mehmet Efe
Hajduk

References

Sources
 Onur Akdogu, "Bir Başkaldırı Öyküsü Zeybekler, Cilt 1 - 3 Tarihi - Ezgileri - Dansları" ("A Story of Rebellion - Zeybeks" (3 volumes: History, Music, Dances)), İzmir, Turkey, 2004 

 
Ottoman Army
Anatolian Greeks
Military units and formations of the Ottoman Empire
İzmir
Turkic peoples of Europe
Turkic peoples
Turkish words and phrases
17th-century establishments in the Ottoman Empire
20th-century disestablishments in the Ottoman Empire